The fifth season of the reality television series Basketball Wives LA aired on VH1 from July 17, 2016 until October 23, 2016. It follows the lives of a group of women who have all been somehow romantically linked to professional basketball players.

It was executively produced by Pam Healey, Sean Rankine, Amanda Scott, Shaunie O'Neal, Mark Seliga, and Lisa Shannon.

Production
Basketball Wives LA was revealed on June 20, 2011, with Kimsha Artest, Gloria Govan, Laura Govan, Jackie Christie and Imani Showalter as the cast. Malaysia Pargo and Draya Michele were announced as part of the cast in the series' July 2011 press release. Kimsha Artest stopped showing up for filming because she did not agree with the "shenanigans and drama", which explains why she was not featured in more than one episode. Tanya Williams was to be the eighth official "wife" but left the series after two episodes. The series premiered on August 29, 2011, to 1.81 million viewers.

Cast

Main
Malaysia Pargo: Ex-Wife of Jannero Pargo
Brandi Maxiell: Wife of Jason Maxiell
Jackie Christie: Wife of Doug Christie
Angel Brinks: Ex-Girlfriend of Tyreke Evans
LaTosha Duffey: Fiancée of Iman Shokuohizadeh
Angel Love: Girlfriend of DeJuan Blair
Tami Roman: Ex-Wife of Kenny Anderson
Shaunie O'Neal: Ex-Wife of Shaquille O’Neal

Episodes

References

2016 American television seasons
Basketball Wives